Archiminolia hurleyi is a species of sea snail, a marine gastropod mollusk in the family Solariellidae.

Distribution
This marine species is endemic to New Zealand.

References

  B.A. Marshall (1979), The Trochidae and Turbinidae of the Kermadec Ridge (Mollusca: Gastropoda); New Zealand Journal of Zoology,6:4, 521-552
 Spencer, H.G.; Marshall, B.A.; Maxwell, P.A.; Grant-Mackie, J.A.; Stilwell, J.D.; Willan, R.C.; Campbell, H.J.; Crampton, J.S.; Henderson, R.A.; Bradshaw, M.A.; Waterhouse, J.B.; Pojeta, J. Jr (2009). Phylum Mollusca: chitons, clams, tusk shells, snails, squids, and kin, in: Gordon, D.P. (Ed.) (2009). New Zealand inventory of biodiversity: 1. Kingdom Animalia: Radiata, Lophotrochozoa, Deuterostomia. pp. 161–254

External links
 To Biodiversity Heritage Library (1 publication)
 To World Register of Marine Species

hurleyi
Gastropods of New Zealand
Gastropods described in 1979